Luxembourg competed at the 2018 Winter Olympics in Pyeongchang, South Korea, from 9 to 25 February 2018. It was represented by one competitor, alpine skier Matthieu Osch.

Competitors
The following is the list of number of competitors participating in the Luxembourgish delegation per sport.

Alpine skiing 

Luxembourg qualified one male athlete, signifying the nation's Olympic return to the sport for the first time since 1994. The Luxembourgish Olympic and Sporting Committee sets stricter standards than the International Ski Federation (FIS) to qualify for the Games. This required any alpine skier to at least score two races under 45 FIS points.

Non-competing sport

Cross-country skiing

Kari Peters has reached the standards set by the FIS, however he did not meet the standards by the Luxembourgish Olympic and Sporting Committee for selection to the team. This included getting two races results under 100 FIS points.

See also
Luxembourg at the 2018 Summer Youth Olympics

References

Nations at the 2018 Winter Olympics
2018
2018 in Luxembourgian sport